Bluff or The Bluff is a geographical area, containing eight suburbs in Durban, eThekwini Metropolitan Municipality, KwaZulu-Natal Province, South Africa. The Bluff forms a large part of the South Durban Basin, a sub-region located south of Durban.

History 
The promontory on which Bluff is situated is Durban's most prominent natural landmark. Accordingly, it probably served as an important visual reference for navigational approaches into Durban Harbour.

Between 1907 and 1975, the exposed south-east side of The Bluff housed a whaling station. Since the mid-Nineteenth Century, the region has been purposed for navigational and military uses.  This use has provided protection for much of the area's native vegetation.  Today, the area is considered important in the ecological management of Durban and environment.

Etymology 
The traditional Zulu name for Bluff is isibubulungu, meaning a long, round-shaped ridge.  It also means "white man’s bluff", which may be a reference to habitation by shipwreck survivors. 

The name of the area is derived from the long bluff - two ancient sand dunes on which most of the suburbs lie.

Geography 
The Bluff promonotory is a remnant of an extensive coastal dune system that formed along the shoreline of KwaZulu-Natal between two and five million years ago.

Lying just south of Durban, the Bluff is one of the main enclosing elements of Durban Harbour from the Indian Ocean, and forms the southern quayside of the Port of Durban.

Organisationally and administratively, it is included in the eThekwini Metropolitan Municipality as a South Central Suburb.

The Bluff lies on the Indian Ocean coastline which lies on the east and borders the Port of Durban (Island View) to the north-west, the defunct Durban International Airport and the SAPREF Petrochemical Refinery to the south, Mobeni to the south-west and Port of Durban (Bayhead) and Clairwood to the west.

Within the area referred to as "The Bluff" lie the suburbs of Brighton Beach, Fynnland, Grosvenor, Jacobs, Merebank, Ocean View, Treasure Beach and Wentworth.

Beaches 
The Bluff is a popular holiday destination, with extensive accommodation and plentiful seaside recreation.  The area is known for its abundant sea life, including dolphins, and, in the winter months, whales.

The Bluff has access to six beaches including Ansteys Beach, Brighton Beach, Cuttings Beach, Garvies Beach and Treasure Beach. Amongst these beaches Ansteys and Brighton beaches are the most popular with Ansteys Beach home to two pools and Brighton Beach to three pools including one tidal pool. Most of the other beaches along the Bluff remain quiet and unspoilt.

Economy 
At the south end of the Bluff are two main residential suburbs: Wentworth and Merebank. Interspersed among the houses are a number of industries, including two of South Africa's largest oil refineries (Sapref and Engen facilities), the Mondi Paper Mill and other smaller factories. Durban's main airport was nearby until 2010. Durban International Airport moved and changed its name on 1 May 2010, relocating from the South Durban Basin to near Verulam, on the North Coast.

The mixture of residential homes and large industries in the basin creates a challenge for all those who live and work in the area. Air pollution, water pollution, overcrowding and litter are some of the problems that residents and industries need to deal with. Community groups are attempting to resolve the issue by working with the large industries in the area.

Transport 
The M4 highway is the nearest highway to the Bluff, running east of the suburban area. It runs through the South Durban Basin from the N2 highway (to Amanzimtoti and Port Shepstone) in the south to Durban CBD in the north. The M7 links the Bluff to Clairwood, Rossburgh, Queensburgh and Pinetown.

The two arterial routes of the Bluff include Marine Drive which runs along the coast linking Merebank, Treasure Beach, Brighton Beach and Ocean View and Tara/Lighthouse Road which runs inland linking Merebank, Engen Petrochemical Refinery, Jacobs, Wentworth, Grosvenor and Fynnlands.

Amenities 
The Bluff is served by four shopping centers namely Bluff Towers and Hillside Mall in Wentworth which are the two largest in the Bluff, Merebank Mall in Merebank and the Bluff Shopping Centre in Grosvenor.  

The Bluff is also serviced by two police stations in Wentworth and Brighton Beach, a public hospital which is the Wentworth District Hospital which mainly serves most suburbs south of Durban and a large golf course, Bluff National Park Golf Club between Grosvenor and Ocean View.

References

External links

 eThekwini Online Accessed 9 March 2010
 KwaZulu-Natal Tourism Authority Accessed 9 March 2010
 KwaZulu-Natal search engine Accessed 9 March 2010

Suburbs of Durban